The Russian LGBT Network is a non-governmental LGBT rights organization working for the social acceptance of and protection of the rights of LGBT people in Russia. Founded in 2006, it was reformed into the first (and only) Russian inter-regional LGBT rights organization on October 19, 2008. The organization is a member of the International Lesbian and Gay Association (ILGA) and is led by Russian LGBT rights activist Igor Kochetkov.

Goals 
The network was created to rally public support for the elimination of discrimination based on sexual orientation and gender identity, to spread the idea of tolerance in Russian society and to help LGBT people lead public lives.

Structure 
The network is governed by a conference, which meets at least once a year. Between conferences, the network is managed by a council headed by a chairperson; both are elected by the conference. The network has 13 regional branches: 

 Saint Petersburg
 Petrozavodsk
 Pskov
 Arkhangelsk
 Volgograd
 Kazan
 Naberezhnye Chelny
 Perm
 Samara
 Tyumen
 Omsk
 Tomsk
 Kemerovo
 Novosibirsk

Two offices, in Krasnoyarsk and Khabarovsk, were closed at the beginning of 2010. In addition, the network has 11 LGBT organizations: 

 Exit LGBT Organization (St. Petersburg)
 LesbiPARTYya (St. Petersburg)
 Serving Nuntiare et Recreare (LGBT Christians) (St. Petersburg)
 Perspective (Arkhangelsk)
 Ural-Positive (Ekaterinburg)
 Anti-Dogma Info (Chelyabinsk)
 League (Volgograd)
 Human Rights Center of Krasnoyarsk 
 The Walls Need to Talk (SDG) (Krasnoyarsk)
 Karelia Circle (Petrozavodsk)
 Rainbow House (Tyumen)

Activities 
The network offers organizational support and guidance to psychologists, lawyers and other professionals working with the LGBT community, activist groups and local human rights and LGBT rights organizations. With other human rights organizations like Memorial, it seeks recognition for members of the LGBT community who suffered criminal persecution in USSR as victims of political repression.

2009 
2009 was declared the Memorial Year for Gay and Lesbian Victims of Political Repression, in recognition of the 75th anniversary of the criminalization of homosexuality.

At a February 2009 Moscow press conference the Russian LGBT Network and the Moscow Helsinki Group released a paper entitled "The Situation for Lesbians, Gays, Bisexuals and Transgendered People in the Russian Federation", the first in-depth study of the legal position of LGBT people in Russian history. The 100-page paper analyzes relevant Russian laws, citing specific examples of rights infringement and discrimination.

From March 23 to March 29, 2009 the network sponsored the third Week Against Homophobia in Russia, with roundtables, films, demonstrations and performances in Arkhangelsk, Kemerovo, Tomsk, Omsk, Krasnoyarsk, Naberezhnye Chelny, Novosibirsk, Petrozavodsk, Tyumen, Rostov-na-Donu, Chelyabinsk and Saint Petersburg. There is also an "Assistance manual for those who suffered from discrimination or hate crimes" on the official Russian LGBT Network website.
 

On May 17, 2009, the International Day Against Homophobia, the network organized a "rainbow flash mob" in Saint Petersburg. Bringing together from 100 to 250 people, the network considered it the largest demonstration in Russian history for LGBT rights and smaller demonstrations have been held in more than 30 Russian cities.

On July 15, 2009, representatives of the Russian LGBT Network met Russian Federation human-rights commissioner Vladimir Lukin and gave him a copy of the report. According to Lukin, LGBT people have the same rights as others: "If certain people’s rights are violated because of the sexual orientation of those people, we are ready to protect them". According to Igor Petrov, it was the first official meeting of a state representative with LGBT activists in Russian history.

In August 2009 a brochure about gay and lesbian family rights was published in Russia, examining legal problems faced by same-sex families in contemporary Russia. On August 11 the network sent a written request to the Prosecutor General of Russia to bring a criminal case against environmentalist Oleg Mitvol, whom Igor Petrov accused of fomenting discrimination against LGBT people. The network filed an August 24 complaint with the Prosecutor General against Sergey Ponomarev, deputy chief editor of Komsomolskaya Pravda, for making defamatory public statements about the sexual orientation of individuals. On January 11, 2010, the public prosecutor's office issued a warning to the newspaper: "The examination established that Ponomarev’s statements expressed the negative attitude towards the people with homosexual orientation. For the above-stated reason, the inter-district prosecutor's office issues a warning to the ZAO Komsomolskaya Pravda Publishing House, that breaches of the law in the mass media are intolerable".

On September 17–27, 2009, an International Festival of Queer Culture was held in Saint Petersburg celebrating homosexuals and "different" people. Among the participants were the groups Kolibri, Iva Nova, Betty and S’nega; poets Dita Karelina, Liya Kirgetova and Elena Novozhilova, and singers Olga Krauze and Tatiana Puchko. The festival also featured photo exhibitions, theater performances, poetry readings, art workshops, films, drag-king shows, seminars and discussions.

At its 97th session on October 30, 2009 the United Nations Human Rights Committee presented a report about human rights in Russia based on the Russian LGBT Network report, emphasizing the violation of LGBT rights.
In a December 24, press release, the network praised Patriarch Kirill's declaration of the inadmissibility of discrimination based on sexual orientation.

2010 

 In September, the LGBT-sport Federation is formed  in Cologne.
 The Psychological Support Hotline is created to help people who found themselves in a difficult situation or suffered from discrimination based on sexual orientation or gender.
 The first Saint Petersburg Gay Pride takes place.
 On October 21, ECHR recognized the prohibition of gay parades in Moscow illegal.
 On October 29 there were two demonstrations: "The Equality March" with thirty marchers and the 5th Gay Pride with fifty marchers.

2014 
In Samara and Tolyatti on May 17, events were held in the framework of the International day against homophobia and transphobia. Together with other tens of thousands of people who participated in a variety of actions around the world on this day, Samaritans and Tolyatti launched colorful balloons into the air and held other festive events. After all, the occasion is very important - it was on May 17, 1990, who excluded homosexuality from the list of diseases. Since then, the entire international medical community has recognized homosexuality and bisexuality, as well as heterosexuality, as variations of normal sexual orientation. In Tolyatti, the holiday was celebrated very joyfully. Twenty-five balls of the color of the rainbow were launched into the sky Tolyatti right in the center of the city. Eight people took part in the action. LGBT people from the Capital and their friends are taking part in such a rainbow flash mob for the second year in a row. But no matter how cheerful the holiday – do not forget about the consequences of state homophobia. LGBT activist "AVERS" Alina Aliyeva decided to refresh the memory of citizens about last year's events in Volgograd on the night of may 9-10, when a group of thugs brutally killed Vladislav Tornov, suspecting him of homosexuality. Leaflets about this crime and its causes were received by residents of Samara houses in their mailboxes. [Russian LGBT Network]

On September 5–7, a meeting of the Interregional Coordination Council (ICC) of the Russian LGBT Network took place in Moscow. Among other things, the results of the work in 2014 were summed up: in 2014, activists of the Russian LGBT Network organized 165 events devoted to the work with LGBT community and with the wider population to inform people about the problems of lesbians, gays and bisexual and transgender people in Russia. ICC is new form of interregional cooperation, established in 2013 in order enhance the effectiveness of work in the regions; it consists of the elected members of the regional and collective members. This time 25 people took part in the work of the Council. The results of the work in 2014 and future of the organization were among the topics discussed during the meeting. In 2014, the following actions were organized in various regions of Russia: 53 events to spread information about LGBT rights and problems, 144 events for the members of LGBT community, 33 street actions and 21 advocacy events; the lawyers of the Network worked with 12 cases in the courts. It turned out that Tyumen LGBT organization “Raduzhny Dom”, Murmansk regional organization “Maximum” and Sverdlovsk and Voronezh regional branches of Russian LGBT Network were the most active in 2014. The chairperson of the Russian LGBT Network Igor Kochetkov stated: “This meeting was an inspiration for all of us. Despite of numerous difficulties, our activists have ideas and resources to make it fly. Right now many human rights activist are quite pessimistic, but the Network works on and ready to face the future with confidence”. (Article - Russian LGBT Network)

In November 2014,the following members of the Board were elected:Tatiana Vinnichenkois the Chairperson of the Board of the Russian LGBT Network; she isalso a human rights defender  and  feminist. In 2014, Tatiana Vinnichenko was elected into the Board of the Movement for the second time –she became the Chairperson of the Board and replaced Igor Kochetkov in thatcapacity. Igor  Kochetkovis  a  public  figure,  human  rights  defender. Since 2004, Igor Kochetkov is an activist of the Russian LGBT movement. In 2008, he was elected to be the first Chairperson of the Russian LGBT Network and held this position until November 2014. In 2013, he was included in the list of The Leading Global Thinkers (by Foreign Policy magazine). In 2014, Igor Kochetkov was a nominee for the Nobel Peace Prize. In addition, he is a member of the St. Petersburg Human Rights Council. Kseniya Kirichenkois a legal expert and human rights defender. Since  2012,  Kseniya  is  the  coordinator  of  the  strategic  litigation  program  and  the  program  on  international advocacy in the LGBT initiative group “Coming Out”. She is also the Director of the Transgender LegalDefense Project. Elena  Shakhova  is  involved in  various  projects  devoted  to  the  formation  of  independent and  impartialcourt, legal  aid,  work  with  young  human  rights  activists,  and  distribution  of  information  about  NGOs  in  Russia. Moreover, Elena actively participates in the work of EU-Russia Civil Society Forum, Human Rights and the Rule of Law working group.For a long time the Citizens Watch supports the Russian LGBT Network and Elena Shakhova –supports various LGBT-related projects aimed at the civil society in Russia. Anna  Gizullinais  is the head of the Sverdlovsk regional branch of the Russian LGBT Network. For  the  years  when  Anna  Gizullina  was  the  head  of  the  Sverdlovsk  regional  branch  of  the  Russian  LGBT Network,this regional division became one of the most effective in the Movement. Mikhail  Tumasovis  an  LGBT  activist  and  human  rights  defender. Mikhail  has  an  extensive  managerial experience. In 2011, he founded Samara's social LGBT-movement “Avers” and Samara's regional branch of the Russian LGBT Network. Over the 3 years when Mikhail was the head of Avers, the organization became well  known  in  the  region  and  all  over  the  country. Polina Balyavahas a lot of experience of work with NGOs. Over last ten years, she is coordinating various social projects. Polina Balyaeva is an individual member of the Russian LGBT Network since the creation of the Movement. Moreover, Polina Balyaeva is a trainer of the Russian LGBT Network, specialist in fundraising and teambuilding. She worked with more than 25 projects in various NGOs. [6]

The Russian LGBT Network summarized the results of the poll devoted to the violation of LGBT’ human rights in Russia. The survey showed that almost half of the respondents faced psychological violence in 2014. The survey showed that in 2014, 47% of LGBT faced psychological violence, 15% - physical violence; 21% of respondents encountered violation of their rights related to personal data protection, 37% had difficulties with employment or with the employer because of their sexual orientation or gender identity. At the same time, only 7% of respondents stated that they are willing to report to the police if their rights are violated. The survey also showed that this year more people than before know about the services of the Russian LGBT Network. Thus, 23% of respondents new about the hotline, 28% - about free psychological counselling and legal aid at the time surveyed. PR manager of the Russian LGBT Network Svetlana Zakharova stated that “The survey shows that the so-called “propaganda law” adopted in 2013 negatively affected LGBT community in Russia. Moreover, over the years the research proves that the statements of some politicians that LGBT in Russia don't face any discrimination are unfounded”. Starting from 2007, the Russian LGBT Network conducts an annual anonymous survey devoted to the violation of human rights and discrimination based on SOGI. Every year 1000-3000 people participate. In 2014, the survey was conducted from the beginning of August until the end of September, 1092 people participated. [Article - Russian LGBT Network]

2015 
In 2015, the Russian LGBT Network has documented 284 reported cases of  violence  and  discrimination  against  LGBT  people  in  Russia.  These  cases  included those that were recorded by monitoring teams in nine Russian cities as well as the results of the processing of reportings to the legal aid service of the Russian LGBT Network and reports of violations via the website of the Russian LGBT Network. Physical violence – 52 cases One  of  the  largest  problems  with  monitoring  violations  based  on  SOGI  (Sexual Orientation and Gender Identity) is that often survivors of these violations are not open about their identity,resulting in an unwillingness to resort to law enforcement authorities.Abuses by law enforcement officials – 21 cases.Monitoring shows that the fears faced by survivors of violence and discrimination  are  not  at  all  baseless.  In  2015,  21  abuses  by  law  enforcement  agencies  were  recorded.  Those  abuses  include  refusals  to  accept  reports,  psychological violence against the victims, humiliation, and illegal detention.Violations of labor law – 22 cases.Violations  of  labor  law  include  instances  of    illegal  dismissals,  refusal  to hire a potential employee, and harassment at the workplace due to SOGI. Layoffs or changing a decision to hire in these cases took place after the individual came out or was outed to employers, which confirms their homophobic motive. Examples of such cases are listedbelow, the first of which occurred in Omsk.Discrimination and violence against transgender people – 20 cases.In this group the following cases are documented:physical violence (6 cases);violation of labor rights (6 cases);restricted access to goods and services due to transphobia (6 cases);unjustified refusal to change documents (2 cases).Violation of the right to freedom of assembly – 26 cases.Types of documented cases: unreasonable refusals to harmonize public LGBT actions, public actions breakings by law enforcement officials, and illegal  detention  of  participants  and  pressure  on  the  organizers. Family violence, violation of parental rights – 9 cases.The  section  includes  physical  violence,  restriction  of  freedom  of  movement,  and  turning  LGBT  teenagers  and  young  adults  (under  20  years  old)  out of house by parents. Of course, there are many more cases like these. A project  “Children-404”  alone,  that  works  on  this  topic,  recorded  thousands  of  stories. [MONITORING OFDISCRIMINATION AND VIOLENCE BASED ON SOGI IN RUSSIA IN 2015:  GENERAL INFORMATION ]

As part of the "Week against homophobia and transphobia" April 4, 2015 Arkhangelsk LGBT activists held an action "Angels of Death". During this action, information was distributed to residents of the city and explanatory conversations were held.Blood on Angels as a symbol of multiple murders and attacks on LGBT people of Arkhangelsk. What is homophobia? How many brutal attacks have people been subjected to? All this could be learned from these leaflets. "Say words of encouragement, as did many stars of show business, people of culture and science, doctors and teachers, our moms and dads, our children. We are waiting for your kind words " - reads the text of the leaflet. On March 28, as part of the Week against homophobia and transphobia-2015, the Novosibirsk  LGBT Network and the service project for transgender people "T9 NSK" held a seminar "Stop discrimination".The presenters spoke  about the concepts of "stigma" and "discrimination" - what it is in General, about the reflection in the cultures of some peoples and about the origins of stigma, originating from ancient times. A detailed analysis of concepts and a heated discussion made it clear that the manifestation and content of stigma and discrimination are always equally destructive and any xenophobia is unacceptable.[4]

IDAHOT 2015 in Russia On May 17, various events devoted to the International Day against Homophobia, Transphobia and Biphobia took place all over the world. In Russia, Rainbow flashmobs and other events took place in 16 cities - in Arkhangelsk, Voronezh, Ekaterinburg, Krasnodar, Moscow, Nakhodka, Novosibirsk, Murmansk, Samara, St. Petersburg, Omsk, Perm, Tolyatti, Tomsk, Tyumen and Khabarovsk. Most rallies took place without serious incidents.The first flashmobs in Russia went in the Far East, in Nakhodka and Khabarovsk. And while in Nakhodka the event passed without any disturbances, the organizer of the Rainbow flashmob in Khabarovsk Alexander Ermoshkin was attacked before the demonstration.“Over 350 people celebrated IDAHO in the center of St. Petersburg on Marsovo Pole, this event becoming the largest LGBT rally as of today in Russia. Representatives of “Coming Out”, the Russian LGBT Network, Side by Side LGBT festival, the Youth Human Rights Group, and the Center for Development of Democracy and Human Rights spoke of the importance of solidarity within civil society, support of vulnerable groups, and the growing strength of the LGBT movement in our common struggle for peace and human rights in Russia”.  In Krasnodar the LGBT organization “Revers” and the regional branch of the Russian LGBT Network organized the Rainbow flashmob.[5]

From 7 to 9 November 2015, a Forum of LGBT activists and activists was held in the Moscow region. It was attended by 150 people from 26 cities of Russia: Alexandrov, Arkhangelsk, Astrakhan, Belomorsk, Vladivostok, Voronezh, Yekaterinburg, Irkutsk, Kazan, Krasnodar, Krasnoyarsk, Moscow, Murmansk, Nakhodka, Nizhny Novgorod, Novosibirsk, Omsk, Orel, Perm, Rostov-on-don, Samara, St. Petersburg, Syktyvkar, Tomsk, Tyumen, Khabarovsk. Organized by the Russian LGBT network, the Forum has become a platform for exchange of experience and communication for a variety of LGBT organizations, initiative groups and activists and an important step towards the development of the LGBT movement. The forum showed that, despite the difficult situation with LGBT rights in the country, the movement lives, develops and becomes stronger.[LGBT network website]

2016 
14 April In Barnaul (Russian city), the court decided to block the website of 'the Children 404 project', which was created in the spring of 2013 to provide support and psychological assistance to LGBT adolescents. The founder of the project, Elena Klimova, urged readers to use the means of bypassing locks and said that the site will continue to work as a library.

During the meeting, the Russian LGBT Network reports, a representative of the prosecutor's office provided documents stating that the community of the project on the VKontakte social network has already been blocked by a decision of the Kaluga District Court, which appears in the case against Elena Klimova and the project for helping LGBT teenagers for the first time. Despite this, the prosecutor's office did not abandon its demand to block the group.

The court refused to recognize the group in VKontakte social network as forbidden (most likely the reason is that the group was already recognized as such by the decision of the Kaluga court), but it satisfied the requirements of the prosecutor in so far as the project site is concerned. According to Maria Kozlovskaya, senior lawyer of the Russian LGBT Network, “apparently, the decision was made in advance, and no expert opinions were of any importance”.

The decisions of the Central District Court of Barnaul and the Kaluga District Court will be appealed to higher instances.

August 29 The regional branch of the political party "Yabloko" in the elections to the Legislative Assembly of St. Petersburg included in its election program a paragraph stating the need to "recognize LGBT people as a social group." “As a party that fights for human rights and for the absence of discrimination in society, as well as for the European way of developing the country, we do not accept any form of discrimination on the grounds of gender, race, nationality, religion, sexual orientation. Religion and sexual preferences are private human life, "- said in a program posted on the official website of Yabloko. Thus, the political party tried to increase its electorate thereby taking a leading position in the government. The party also tried to positively influence people's minds.

November 19 In St. Petersburg, sentenced to “gay hunter” and his accomplices Two members of the gang hunter gang escaped with suspended sentences. One was sentenced to a real term of two years and three months. All gang members admitted their guilt and agreed to cooperate with the investigation. How many homosexuals became victims of the trinity, one can only speculate. Only one man turned to the police, from whom in January 2016 a gang extorted 500,000 rubles. '... He hit me on the back of my head and leg. Another demonstrated ... a sewing needle and threatened to stick it in my eye; 'followed by a threat to forcibly undress him and photograph him naked'

2017 
LGBT Forum 2017 From November 3 to 5, the largest human rights event in Russia dedicated to the laws of LGBT communities in Russia took place in the Moscow Region - Forum of LGBT activists and activists! In 2017, the main theme of the Forum was “The LGBT Movement in Civil Society: Solidarity and Coalitions.” The 2017 LGBT Activist and Activist Forum brought together about 300 people from all over Russia and has become a unique space free of necessity! In 2017, the Forum has already opened for the third time. The Forum program includes not only a huge number of trainings, seminars and panel discussions, But also a cultural program and even classes in meditation and evenings. In addition, the Reporting-Election Conference of the Russian LGBT Network was held on November 5 and 6 as part of the Forum! Council of the interregional social movement “Russian LGBT Network”. The new Council included Misha Tumasov, Polina Balyaeva, Secretary of the Council, Artem Nikiforov, Zoya Matisova, Oksana Berezovskaya, Svetlana Zakharova, Tor Shirokov.

Chechnya Officially in Chechnya, as part of the Russian Federation, LGBT people are not prosecuted by law. However, in practice in this region, the topic of homosexuality is a social taboo, as a result of which LGBT people are subjected to systematic violence by society and police. Of particular relevance were reports of massive unlawful detentions, torture and killings of Chechen gays in 2017. Human rights activists called the ongoing mass mopping-up of a social group unprecedented. In March 2017, the human rights organization Russian LGBT Network began to receive information that mass detentions, torture and killings of homosexual men had begun in Chechnya. On March 29, this organization opened the e-mail hotline. On April 1, Novaya Gazeta published an article reporting more than a hundred illegally detained and at least three murdered gay men in Chechnya. At the same time, journalists referred to "an unprecedentedly large number of sources", among which were LGBT activists, unofficial sources in the local UFSB, the Ministry of Internal Affairs, the prosecutor's office and the administration of the head of the republic. Among the detainees, famous muftis and journalists were mentioned. The information about the mass detentions was confirmed by the human rights activist E. L. Sokiryanskaya. On April 3, Novaya Gazeta journalist Elena Milashina said that the number of deaths could be more than 50 people. According to Novaya Gazeta's investigation, the first wave of illegal detentions began in the early days of February, when a young man was arrested in Chechnya while intoxicated. While viewing his phone, police found intimate materials, as well as contacts of local homosexuals. As a result, mass detentions and killings began. The second wave of repression occurred after LGBT activists of the GayRussia.ru project, as part of an all-Russian company, applied for a gay parade in several cities in the region (Nalchik, Cherkessk, Stavropol, Maykop). According to the Radio Liberty investigation, mass arrests of homosexuals in Chechnya began in December 2016. Later, many other media outlets published interviews with the victims, including The Guardian and BBC. Since April 2017, the Russian LGBT Network has evacuated around 150 people out of Chechnya, with the majority settling outside of Russia, who were threatened by the ongoing anti-gay purges in Chechnya.

Annual film festival "side to side" ("bok o bok")

Homophobia

Year 2017, according to the Sova Information and Analytical Center, the number of attacks on LGBT activists in Russia was more than in 2016. So, in 2017, 11 representatives of the LGBT community were injured and beaten. In 2016, statistics showed four wounded and one murder due to hatred of gays. It is noted that most of the victims are participants in LGBT actions, such as the rally in memory of hated transgender people in Yaroslavl and the LGBT pride in St. Petersburg on August 12. If, in an attack on the homeless, the concept of “inciting hatred of a social group” is often taken into account by the court, then in the case of LGBT people, this wording does not apply. So, in a verdict in May in St. Petersburg for the murder of journalist Dmitry Tsilikin, the hatred motive was not taken into account. At the same time, the journalist's killer Sergey Kosyrev called himself a “cleaner”, his life “a crusade against a certain social group” (meaning gays), and the feeling with which he killed Tsilikin “was not hostility, as the protocol says, but hatred ". Civic activist Natalya Tsymbalova initiated a petition calling for the re-qualification of the case as a hate crime. Nevertheless, Kosarev was convicted of domestic murder (part 1 of article 105 of the Criminal Code) and sentenced to eight and a half years in prison.“Fortunately, rally participants and journalists covering the rally suffered little,” said Sova.

On 17 May 2019, the association reported that seven people broke into the apartment of one of its volunteers in Saint Petersburg who was not publicly identified. The unidentified assailants threatened the activist and other staff with physical violence and murder. He was aggressively interrogated and threatened with violence. “We will take you to the police office and will break all your bones,” they were told by one of the attackers. The assailants were allegedly looking for a young Chechen woman who had escaped from the region, as well as the Russian LGBT Network emergency programme coordinator David Isteev. The activist said “They told me to tell David Isteev that they were going to find and kill him,” Three of the assailants were identified as Chechens and four implied they were police officers from Chechnya's capital Grozny, but refused to provide identification documents.

See also 
 LGBT rights in Russia
 Gayrussia.ru

References

External links 
 Russian LGBT network — Official site.

LGBT events in Russia
LGBT political advocacy groups in Russia
2006 establishments in Russia
Unregistered public associations listed in Russia as foreign agents